Synemosyna is a genus of ant mimicking jumping spiders that was first described by Nicholas Marcellus Hentz in 1846.

Species

 it contains twenty species, found in the Caribbean, Central America, South America, the United States, and Mexico:
Synemosyna americana (Peckham & Peckham, 1885) – Mexico to Venezuela
Synemosyna ankeli Cutler & Müller, 1991 – Colombia
Synemosyna aschnae Makhan, 2006 – Suriname
Synemosyna aurantiaca (Mello-Leitão, 1917) – Colombia, Brazil, Argentina
Synemosyna decipiens (O. Pickard-Cambridge, 1896) – Mexico, Guatemala
Synemosyna edwardsi Cutler, 1985 – Mexico to Costa Rica
Synemosyna formica Hentz, 1846 (type) – USA
Synemosyna hentzi Peckham & Peckham, 1892 – Brazil
Synemosyna invemar Cutler & Müller, 1991 – Colombia
Synemosyna lauretta Peckham & Peckham, 1892 – Brazil, Argentina
Synemosyna lucasi (Taczanowski, 1871) – Colombia to Peru and Guyana
Synemosyna maddisoni Cutler, 1985 – Mexico, Guatemala
Synemosyna myrmeciaeformis (Taczanowski, 1871) – Venezuela, Brazil, French Guiana
Synemosyna nicaraguaensis Cutler, 1993 – Nicaragua
Synemosyna paraensis Galiano, 1967 – Brazil, French Guiana
Synemosyna petrunkevitchi (Chapin, 1922) – USA, Cuba
Synemosyna scutata (Mello-Leitão, 1943) – Brazil
Synemosyna smithi Peckham & Peckham, 1894 – Cuba, St. Vincent
Synemosyna taperae (Mello-Leitão, 1933) – Brazil
Synemosyna ubicki Cutler, 1988 – Costa Rica

References

External links
 Photographs of Synemosyna species from Brazil
 Painting of Synemosyna sp.
 Picture of S. formica

Further reading

Salticidae
Salticidae genera
Spiders of North America
Spiders of South America
Taxa named by Nicholas Marcellus Hentz